The 1977 Andhra Pradesh cyclone was a devastating tropical cyclone that hit Andhra Pradesh in November 1977, killing at least 10,000 people. The worst affected areas were in the Krishna River delta region. The island of Diviseema, which was hit by a seven-metre-high storm surge, experienced a loss of life running into the thousands. The large loss of life prompted the establishment of early warning meteorological stations on the coast of Andhra Pradesh. Cyclone shelters and other measures for disaster management were also taken. A memorial, at the point of furthest advance of the tidal wave, near the town of Avanigadda, was built in memory of the people who died in the storm.

Meteorological History

Traveling due west at  along the southern periphery of the mid-tropospheric subtropical ridge, the disturbance steadily organized, with increased banding noted on satellite imagery. This increase in organization prompted the India Meteorological Department (IMD) to report that the disturbance had intensified into a deep depression later that morning, and the Joint Typhoon Warning Center (JTWC) to issue a Tropical Cyclone Formation Alert for the system at 13:10 UTC that afternoon.

While the system was initially developing, an upper tropospheric trough had formed over northern and central India and produced a break in the subtropical ridge. As the storm traveled towards this break in the ridge on 15 November, the mid-tropospheric anticyclone over the system weakened, reducing the storm's steering flow and causing the system to slow to a  northwestwards movement. In addition, the divergent southwesterly flow produced by the trough resulted in the system beginning a period of rapid intensification. Early on 16 November, the system intensified into a Category 1-equivalent tropical cyclone on the Saffir-Simpson Hurricane Scale; an eye was observed on satellite imagery later that morning.

For the next two days, the tropical cyclone continued to strengthen while traveling generally towards the north-northwest. During this time period, increased organization, such as tighter banding features and a progressively more distinct eye, were observed on satellite imagery.

As the cyclone approached the Indian coast, it accelerated to  while slightly weakening from its peak intensity. Moving northwards over flat agricultural lands, the storm weakened, with the JTWC issuing its final warning at 20:00 UTC that evening. The IMD continued tracking the system, reporting that it weakened into an area of low pressure on the evening of 20 November before dissipating over southeastern Madhya Pradesh and Odisha the next evening.

Impact 
The worst affected areas were in the Krishna River delta region. The island of Diviseema, which was hit by a seven-metre-high storm surge, experienced a loss of life running into the thousands. Hundreds of bodies were floating in the waters and bodies bloated beyond recognition were consigned to mass pyres. Landslides ripped off the railway lines in the Waltair-Kirandal route. About 100 people who had left their homes to seek shelter in a church in Bapatla town were killed when the building collapsed. Fields of paddy and cash crops were submerged by the tidal waves. Thirteen sailing vessels, including some foreign ones, went missing in the storm.

About 100 villages were marooned or washed away by the cyclonic storms and the ensuing floods and a total of 10,841 killed or missing, and 34 lakh rendered homeless. According to the Janata party, at least 50,000 people were believed to have been killed by the storm, substantially higher than reported by the government.

Aftermath 
The large loss of life prompted the establishment of early warning meteorological stations on the coast of Andhra Pradesh. Cyclone shelters and other measures for disaster management were also taken. A memorial, at the point of furthest advance of the tidal wave, near the town of Avanigadda, was built in memory of the people who died in the storm.

The next cyclone (1990) that also occurred in Andhra Pradesh, showed that there was a large improvement in disaster management, effective warnings ahead of time, and better meteorological equipment which dramatically reduced the death rate (compared to the cyclone in 1977).

In the wake of the disaster, officials in India were accused of covering up the scale of damage and loss of life. Members of the Janata party, an opposing political group to the state government in place at the time, claimed that the cover up was to hide criminal negligence which resulted in tens of thousands of fatalities. Following these accusations, five high-ranking government officials resigned from their positions.

See also

Typhoon Gay (1989)
1996 Andhra Pradesh cyclone

Notes

References

Andhra Pradesh Cyclone, 1977
Andhra Pradesh Cyclone, 1977
Tropical cyclones in India
Super cyclonic storms